Phaea tricolor is a species of beetle in the family Cerambycidae. It was described by Henry Walter Bates in 1881. It is known from Guatemala and Mexico.

References

tricolor
Beetles described in 1881